Daniel Bounty (born 2 September 2001) is an Australian Paralympic athlete. He represented Australia at the 2020 Summer Paralympics.

Early life
Daniel Bounty was born on 2 September 2001. At age eight he had a stroke after he was involved in a bodysurfing accident.The accident led to a slow bleed in his brain which clotted.  He attended Pacific Lutheran College and Caloundra State High School.

Athletics career
Bounty is classified as T38. At the 2017 World Junior Para-Athletics Championships in Dubai, he finished fourth in the Men's 800m U18 T35-38. In June 2021, he shaved over 3.5 seconds off his personal best in running 4:10.08 in the 1500m.

At the 2020 Summer Paralympics, he finished sixth in the Men's 1500 m T38.

In 2021, he is coached by Peter Bock.

References

External links 
 
 
 Athletics Australia Historical Results

Paralympic athletes of Australia
Athletes (track and field) at the 2020 Summer Paralympics
Living people
2001 births
Australian male middle-distance runners
21st-century Australian people